Carpenders Park is a railway station located between the Hertfordshire suburb of Carpenders Park and the South Oxhey housing estate,  south of Watford Junction on the Watford DC Line. The station is an island platform reached by a subway. This has exits to both the Carpenders Park (east) and South Oxhey (west) estates. London Overground services from London Euston to Watford Junction currently serve this station.

History
The first station was opened by the London & North Western Railway on 1 April 1914 only to close on 1 January 1917. It reopened 5 May 1919 served only by London Electric Railway (later became London Underground) trains. L&NWR electric trains were reinstated from 10 July 1922. London Underground trains served the station until 24 September 1982. 
The original station was built to serve the nearby golf course. It was  further north than the current site and was a wooden two platform structure with a footbridge. It was closed on 17 November 1952 when the present station opened.

Ticket barriers were installed in early 2010.

Services 
The general frequency is a train every 15 minutes in each direction.

The average journey time to Watford Junction is 8 minutes and to London Euston 44 minutes.

References

External links 

Railway stations in Three Rivers District
DfT Category E stations
Former London and North Western Railway stations
Railway stations in Great Britain opened in 1914
Railway stations in Great Britain closed in 1917
Railway stations in Great Britain opened in 1919
Railway stations in Great Britain closed in 1952
Railway stations opened by British Rail
Railway stations in Great Britain opened in 1952
Railway stations served by London Overground
Proposed London Underground stations